The Cookeville Micropolitan Statistical Area, commonly known as the Upper Cumberland, as defined by the United States Census Bureau, is an area consisting of three counties in central Tennessee, anchored by the city of Cookeville.

As of the 2010 census, the Cookeville Micropolitan Area had a population of 106,042.

Counties
Jackson
Overton
Putnam

Communities
Algood
Alpine (unincorporated)
Baxter
Cookeville (Principal city)
Gainesboro
Livingston
Monterey

Demographics
At the census of 2000, there were 93,417 people, 37,441 households, and 25,469 families residing within the Cookeville Micropolitan Area. The racial makeup of the Cookeville Micropolitan Area was 95.88% White, 1.22% African American, 0.24% Native American, 0.65% Asian, 0.07% Pacific Islander, 1.13% from other races, and 0.81% from two or more races. Hispanic or Latino of any race were 5.27% of the population.

The median income for a household in the Cookeville Micropolitan Area was $28,110, and the median income for a family was $34,599. Males had a median income of $26,430 versus $20,062 for females. The per capita income for the Cookeville Micropolitan Area was $15,286.

See also
Tennessee census statistical areas

References

 
Geography of Putnam County, Tennessee
Geography of Overton County, Tennessee
Geography of Jackson County, Tennessee